Barnowiec refers to the following places in Poland:

 Barnowiec, Lesser Poland Voivodeship
 Barnowiec, Pomeranian Voivodeship